Jay T. Snyder is a philanthropist, businessman, diplomat and Democratic Party activist.

Public service
Snyder is a former member of the U.S. Advisory Commission on Public diplomacy, a congressionally chartered body that analyzes and provides recommendations on U.S. efforts to understand, engage, inform, and influence the world. Reporting to the President of the United States and the Under Secretary for Public Diplomacy and Public Affairs housed within the U.S. State department, the Commission has produced several reports including one aimed at improving the State Department's ability to attract and retain qualified public diplomacy personnel. Snyder was sworn in as a commissioner in 2003 and served until 2011.

Snyder currently serves as Founder and Chairman of the Board of Directors of Open Hands Initiative, a U.S.-based 501(c)3 nonprofit organization dedicated to improving people-to-people understanding and friendship throughout the world by fostering exchanges and other projects that emphasize our basic shared values and common humanity. Open Hands Initiative launched its first program, August 1, 2010 in Damascus, Syria, and carried out subsequent programs in Egypt (2011) and Myanmar (2013).

In 2010, Snyder was selected by Governor-elect Andrew Cuomo to serve on his transition committee for Health and Education, as well as the committee for Economic Development and Labor, which is tasked with recruiting, reviewing and recommending high-level leaders to staff New York State agencies charged with leading job creation and growing New York's economy.

In 2005, Snyder was appointed to serve as a Commissioner on the New York State Commission for Public Authority Reform.

From 2000 to 2001, Snyder served as Public Delegate, United States Representative to the 55th United Nations General Assembly, functioning as a representative on general policy matters, reform issues, and the Millennium Summit, and formulated and presented statements before the U.N. on a variety of public diplomacy questions.

Snyder serves on several non-profit boards, including the USC Center on Public Diplomacy at the Annenberg School, the Foreign Policy Program Leadership Committee at Brookings Institution, The Humpty Dumpty Institute, Phoenix House, and the Board of Governors of the Milano Graduate School of Management and Urban Policy. He is also an active participant in many charitable organizations, including the Share Our Strength's National Task Force to End Childhood Hunger. Previously he served on the Advisory Board of the Brookings’ Saban Center/Council on Foreign Relations Middle East Project.

Business
Mr. Snyder is a Principal in HBJ Investments. In 2007, Mr. Snyder became the Non-Executive Chairman of Pelion Financial Group. He was a principal of the financial services firms Ashfield Consulting Group and JB Partners. He served as a managing director of Mayberry Core Asset Management, a financial advisory firm serving high-net-worth individuals. Mr. Snyder was a member of the board of directors of the PAIC Insurance Company. Previously Snyder was an executive at Biocraft Laboratories; a publicly held generic drug manufacturer.

Family
Mr. Snyder was born in 1958 in New York City.  His parents, Harold and Beatrice Snyder founded Biocraft Laboratories in 1964. In 1987, Snyder married Tracy Holt Maxwell. The couple currently resides in New York with their three children.

References

External links
 Open Hands Initiative
 Founder of Open Hands Initiative
 Jay T. Snyder in the New York Times
 Open Hands Initiative Featured by AP
 A Bridge to the World Will Keep America Afloat, The Hill

American businesspeople
Living people
Year of birth missing (living people)